The following is a timeline of the history of the city of Waco, Texas, USA.

19th century

 1830 - Hueco village sacked by Cherokees.
 1849 - Shapley Ross founds Waco
 March 1: "First sale of town lots at Waco village."
 1850
 Shapley Ross builds first hotel
 Shapley Ross becomes first postmaster
 Brazos River ferry begins operating.
 Waco becomes seat of newly established McLennan County, Texas.
 1851 - Population: 152.
 1852 - First Street Cemetery established (approximate date).
 1854 - Waco Era newspaper begins publication.
 1856 - Town of Waco incorporated.
 1858 - Southern Democrat newspaper begins publication.
 1861 - Waco University founded.
 1865 - Waco Examiner newspaper begins publication.
 1866 - New Hope Baptist Church established.
 1870
 Waco Suspension Bridge opens.
 Waco Tap Railroad begins operating.
 Population: 3,008.
 1871 - First Presbyterian Church built.
 1872 - Waco and Northwestern Railroad begins operating.
 1873
 Fletcher Cemetery established.
 Sanger Brothers shop in business.
 1877 - Paul Quinn College relocated to Waco from Austin.
 1878 - Oakwood Cemetery established.
 1879 - St. Paul's Episcopal Church rebuilt.
 1880 - Population: 7,295.
 1881 - Rodeph Sholom Synagogue dedicated.
 1884
 Garland Opera House in business.
 McClelland Opera House in business (approximate date).
 1885
 Slayden-Kirksey Woolen Mill in business.
 Baylor University relocated to Waco from Independence.
 Flavored beverage "Dr. Pepper first mixed at Old Corner Drug in Waco."
 1889 - "Hot artesian water...discovered beneath the city."
 1890
 C.C. McCulloch elected mayor.
 Population: 14,445.
 1892 - Geyser Ice Company in business.
 1894 - Cotton Palace Exposition begins.
 1895
 AddRan College relocated to Waco from Thorp Spring.
 Floral Society formed.
 1897 - Waco Times-Herald newspaper in publication.
 1898 - April 1: "Brann-Davis shooting."
 1899 - Public library established.
 1900 - Population: 20,686.

20th century

 1901 - McLennan County Courthouse built.
 1906 - Dr. Pepper bottling plant built.
 1910 - Brazos Valley Cotton Oil mill in business.
 1911
 Amicable Life Insurance Co. building constructed.
 Farmers' Improvement Bank founded.
 Rex Theatre in business.
 1912 - Raleigh Hotel built.
 1914
 Hippodrome Theatre opens.
 Kestner's store in business.
 1916 - May 15: Lynching of Jesse Washington.
 1919 - Elite Cafe in business.
 1920 - Population: 38,500.
 1922 - WACO radio begins broadcasting.
 1923 - July 30: Execution of Roy Mitchell.
 1929 - Alamo Plaza Motor Hotel chain in business.
 1930 - Population: 52,848.
 1931 - St. Francis Catholic Church built.
 1936 - September: Flood.
 1937 - Blue Triangle Young Women's Christian Association formed.
 1945 - U.S. Veterans Administration Medical Center built.
 1950 - Population: 84,706.
 1953 - May: 1953 Waco tornado outbreak.
 1955
 KWTX-TV (television) begins broadcasting.
 Cameron Park Zoo established.
 1964 - Urban renewal project begins.
 1965 - Flood control dam built on Brazos River basin.
 1967 - Historic Waco Foundation established.
 1974 - Oscar De Conge becomes mayor.
 1980 - Population: 101,261.
 1982 - July: 1982 Lake Waco murders.
 1993 - February 28 – April 19: Siege of religious Mount Carmel Center near Waco.

21st century

 2010 - Population: city 124,805; megaregion 19,728,244.
 2012 - Malcolm P. Duncan Jr. becomes mayor.
 2015 - May 17: 2015 Waco shootout.
 2016 - Kyle Deaver becomes mayor.

See also
 Waco, Texas history
 List of mayors of Waco, Texas
 National Register of Historic Places listings in McLennan County, Texas
 Timelines of other cities in Texas: Arlington, Austin, Brownsville, Corpus Christi, Dallas, El Paso, Fort Worth, Houston, Laredo, Lubbock, San Antonio

References

Bibliography

published in 19th c.

published in 20th c.
 
 
 
  circa 1926? (fulltext)
  + chronology
 Roger N. Conger. Highlights of Waco History. Waco: Hill Printing and Stationery Co, 1945.
 
 
 
  (fulltext)

published in 21st c.
  (bibliography)
  (fulltext)

External links

  (fulltext)
 
 
   (bibliography)
 

 
waco